Manasi Sinha is a Bengali film and television actress. She is the daughter of Manideepa Roy, a noted Bengali theatre actress.Age 98

Works

Filmography

Television 
 Checkmate (Indian TV series)
 Maa
 Saat Pake Bandha (later replaced by Namita Chakraborty)
 Bodhu Kon Alo Laaglo Chokhe
 Agnipariksha
 Bhasha
 Raage Anuraage
 Goyenda Ginni
 Potol Kumar Gaanwala
 Bhootu
 I Laugh U
Jai Kali Kalkattawali
Ei Poth Jodi Na Sesh Hoy
''Indu (2021)
Kanyadaan (later replaced by Swagata Mukherjee)

See also 
 Laboni Sarkar
 Locket Chatterjee

References

External links 
 
 

Living people
Actresses in Bengali cinema
Bengali television actresses
Indian film actresses
Indian television actresses
Actresses from Kolkata
Year of birth missing (living people)